Bottle cutting is an activity in which a person cuts a bottle using one of a variety of techniques, to create a new product.  Techniques can include sawing or using hot wire. Around the late 1950s and early 1960s, some restaurants began making glasses by cutting wine bottles. In the late 1960s and early 1970s, bottle cutting kits started to appear on the market. By 1972, the technique had "caught on like wildfire" and was later described as a fad of the previous decade in 1983. The final step in bottle cutting is polishing, because no matter how carefully one cuts a bottle, the edges will be rough.

References

External links
 How-To: Bottle Cutting
 Make: Projects – Bottle cutting
 Bottle Cutting & Sawing, Drilling, Slumping, & Blowing Out
 Easy Bottle Cutting
 http://www.bottlecutting.com/

Crafts
Bottles